John Patrick Ryan (July 30, 1936 – March 20, 2007) was an American actor, best known for his role as Warden Ranken in the 1985 film Runaway Train.

Biography
The son of Irish immigrant parents, Ryan graduated from Rice High School and studied English at the City College of New York.  He was a lifetime member of The Actors Studio.

Ryan died from a stroke in Los Angeles, California, at the age of 70. He was survived by two daughters.

Filmography

Features

 The Tiger Makes Out (1967) as Toni's Escort
 A Lovely Way to Die (1968) as Harry Samson
 What's So Bad About Feeling Good? (1968) as Roger (uncredited)
 Five Easy Pieces (1970) as Spicer 
 Been Down So Long It Looks Like Up to Me (1971) as 'Oeuf'
 The King of Marvin Gardens (1972) as Surtees
 The Legend of Nigger Charley (1972) as Houston
 Shamus (1973) as 'Hardcore'
 Dillinger (1973) as Charles Mackley 
 Cops and Robbers (1973) as Pasquale 'Patsy' Aniello
 It's Alive (1974) as Frank Davis
 The Missouri Breaks (1976) as Cy
 Futureworld (1976) as Dr. Schneider
 It Lives Again (1978) as Frank Davis
 On the Nickel (1980)
 The Last Flight of Noah's Ark (1980) as Coslough
 The Postman Always Rings Twice (1981) as Kennedy
 The Escape Artist (1982) as Vernon
 Breathless (1983) as Lieutenant Parmental
 The Right Stuff (1983) as Head of Program
 The Cotton Club (1984) as Joe Flynn
 Runaway Train (1985) as Warden Ranken
 Avenging Force (1986) as Professor Elliott Glastenbury
 Three O'Clock High (1987) as Mr. O'Rourke
 Fatal Beauty (1987) as Lieutenant Kellerman
 Death Wish 4: The Crackdown (1987) as Ferrari / Fake Nathan White
 Rent-a-Cop (1987) as Wieser
 City of Shadows (1987) as Sergeant Fireman
 Best of the Best (1989) as Jennings
 Delta Force 2: The Colombian Connection (1990) as General Taylor
 Class of 1999 (1990) as Mr. Hardin
 Eternity (1990) as Thomas Vandervere / Prosecutor
 Final Stage (1990)
 White Sands (1992) as Arms Dealer (uncredited)
 Hoffa (1992) as 'Red' Bennett
 Star Time (1992) as Sam Bones
 Batman: Mask of the Phantasm (1993) as 'Buzz' Bronski (voice)
 Young Goodman Brown (1993) as The Devil
 Les patriotes (1994) as Arthur
 Bad Blood (1994) as John Blackstone 
 Tall Tale (1995) as 'Grub'
 Bound (1996) as Mickey Malnato (final film role)

Television
 Kojak (1973, TV series; episode: "Cop in the Cage") as Peter Ibbotson
 Death Scream (1975) as Detective Dave Lambert
 The Rockford Files (1977, TV series; episode: "Dirty Money, Black Light") as Dearborn
 Buck Rogers in the 25th Century (1980, TV series; episode: "Twiki is Missing") as Kurt Belzack
 M*A*S*H (1983, TV series; episode: "That Darn Kid") as Major Van Zandt
 Miss Lonelyhearts (1983; TV film) as Peter Doyle
 Simon & Simon (1984, TV series; episode: "Break a Leg, Darling") as Stewart Crawford
 Cagney & Lacey (1985, TV series; episode: "Organized Crime") as Philip Corrigan
 Houston: The Legend of Texas (1986) as David G. Burnet
 Miami Vice (1989, TV series; episode: "The Cell Within") as Jake Manning
 The Adventures of Brisco County, Jr. (1993, TV series; episode: "Showdown") as Sheriff Bob Cavendish

References

External links
 
 
 John P. Ryan at the Internet Off-Broadway Database
 
 

1936 births
2007 deaths
American male film actors
American male television actors
American people of Irish descent
Male actors from New York City
20th-century American male actors